Impersonator is the third studio album by Canadian pop duo Majical Cloudz, released on May 21, 2013 by Matador Records and Mythryl Records. It was their first album on Matador after signing with the label in February 2013. It was also the group's first album to feature producer Matthew Otto as a member, following the departure of Matthew E. Duffy after the release of II in 2011.

The album was longlisted for the 2013 Polaris Music Prize.

Release and promotion
"Turns Turns Turns" was released on November 5, 2012 as a single from their EP of the same name, which was released on December 3, 2012 by Arbutus Records and Merok Records.

"Childhood's End" was released on March 26, 2013. On April 3, 2013, a music video for "Childhood's End" directed by Emily Kai Bock was released starring Devon Welsh's father Kenneth Welsh.

"Bugs Don't Buzz" was released on May 2, 2013. On June 20, 2013, a music video for "Bugs Don't Buzz" was premiered through NPR. It was directed by Gordon von Steiner and features cockroaches and beetles with miniature furniture and landscaping.

Critical reception

At Metacritic, which assigns a normalised rating out of 100 to reviews from mainstream publications, the album received an average score of 77, based on 23 reviews. Writing for Pitchfork, Jayson Greene praised the album, stating, "Impersonator is a gorgeous record-- extraordinarily sung, hypnotically focused-- but it is Welsh's sense of emotional urgency that makes it special." Fred Thomas of AllMusic said, "With such a wide-open sound, even the confusing and painful parts sound hauntingly beautiful." Writing for Consequence of Sound, Sasha Geffen said, "By paring pop music to its core human elements, Majical Cloudz has written a record that's bare enough to breathe inside. Feeling thrives in the blankness: that's Impersonators paradox." Brice Ezell of PopMatters''' praised Devon Welsh's lyricism and the album's musical simplicity, stating, "Impersonator is an album of intriguing paradox. Its ingredients are so simple that it might have been made in a home or garage studio, but Majical Cloudz' sound is so uniquely and deliberately crafted that it's unlikely just anyone with ProTools could do the same. Welsh's simple sentence-centric lyrics are nothing a budding writer couldn't imitate, but his delivery is more akin to the terse yet resonant style of Ernest Hemingway."

In a less favorable review, Laura Studarus of Under the Radar'' said, "The majority sounds like demos for a fuller, richer album that Welsh undoubtedly has the skills to write."

Year-end lists

Track listing

Personnel
Credits adapted from liner notes.

 Devon Welsh – songwriting, production
 Matthew Otto – production
 Dimitri Condax – mastering

References

2013 albums
Matador Records albums